Ma (hiragana: ま, katakana: マ) is one of the Japanese kana, which each represent one mora. The hiragana is made in three strokes, while the katakana in two. Both represent .

Stroke order

The hiragana ま is made with three strokes:
An  upper horizontal line from left to right.
Another horizontal line going from left to right under the first stroke.
A vertical line from top to bottom, then a small loop towards the left, which then crosses the vertical line going to the right.

The katakana マ is made with two strokes:
 A horizontal line from left to right, accompanied with a diagonal line towards the bottom-left.
 A small line at the end of the diagonal line.

Other communicative representations

 Full Braille representation

 Computer encodings

References

Specific kana